Andong Civic Stadium is a multi-purpose stadium located in Andong, South Korea. It was opened in 1979. Several K-League matches were played at Andong Stadium in 1983, 1984, 1986, 1990, 1995, 2001. It is used mostly for football matches and holds 17,500 people. It was renovated from October 1990 to May 1991.

References

External links
 Andong Stadium at Tour Andong 

Football venues in South Korea
Multi-purpose stadiums in South Korea
Sports venues in North Gyeongsang Province